NZR J class could refer to one of these classes of locomotives operated by New Zealand Railways:
 NZR J class (1874)
 NZR J class (1939)